The 1947 Singapore Open, also known as the 1947 Singapore Badminton Championships, took place from 19 October – 21 December 1947 at the Clerical Union Hall in Balestier, Singapore. The ties were played over a few months with the first round ties being played on the 19 of October and the last few matches (the men's singles and mixed doubles finals) were played on 21 December.

Venue
Clerical Union Hall

Final results

References 

Singapore Open (badminton)
1947 in badminton